A shunt regulated push-pull amplifier is a Class A amplifier whose output drivers (transistors or more commonly vacuum tubes) operate in antiphase. The key design element is the output stage also serves as the phase splitter.

The acronym SRPP is also used to describe a series regulated push-pull amplifier.

References

External links 
 page at tubecad.com
 article at The Valve Wizard

Electronic amplifiers